Connellsville station is a train station in Connellsville, Pennsylvania, United States served by Amtrak, the United States' national railroad passenger system. It is served by the Capitol Limited train twice each day, with one train in one direction and another vice versa.

History 
The current station is the third station placed here. It was constructed during the winter of 2010-11 and cost $1.25 million. Built primarily of dark red brick, the structure has an enclosed, one-story waiting room with large windows. From the outside, the waiting room is marked by projecting bays whose surfaces are covered in a rock-faced, coursed ashlar in a light beige tone. Developed by d+A design+Architecture of Yardley, Pennsylvania, the station design draws inspiration from historic late 19th and early 20th century depots found in small towns across the nation. It is similar to stations Amtrak has built in Okeechobee, Florida, Winnemucca, Nevada and Alliance, Ohio. In addition to the shelter, Amtrak installed a 550-foot concrete platform, signage and light poles. The new station is in the vicinity of the former Baltimore & Ohio Railroad station, which no longer stands.

Station layout

References

External links 

Connellsville Amtrak Station (USA RailGuide -- TrainWeb)

Amtrak stations in Pennsylvania
Former Baltimore and Ohio Railroad stations
Railway stations in the United States opened in 2011